Lockton is a North Yorkshire, England.

Lockton may also refer to:

 Lockton (horse), a racehorse
 Lockton (surname), including a list of people surnamed Lockton
 Lockton, Ontario, Canada
 Lockton Companies, an American insurance broker